Foul Play is a 1978 American romantic neo-noir comedy thriller film written and directed by Colin Higgins, and starring Goldie Hawn, Chevy Chase, Dudley Moore, Burgess Meredith, Eugene Roche, Rachel Roberts, Brian Dennehy and Billy Barty. In it, a recently divorced librarian is drawn into a mystery when a stranger hides a roll of film in a pack of cigarettes and gives it to her for safekeeping.

The film received seven Golden Globe Award nominations, including Best Motion Picture – Musical or Comedy, Best Actress – Motion Picture Musical or Comedy (Hawn), Best Actor – Motion Picture Musical or Comedy (Chase) and Best Supporting Actor in a Motion Picture (Moore), as well as for the Academy Award for Best Original Song, but won none.

The film inspired a television series of the same name starring Barry Bostwick and Deborah Raffin that aired on the ABC network in early 1981, and was cancelled after six episodes.

Plot
A Catholic archbishop returns home, walks into a room and puts on a record. He opens his cupboard and sees the reflection of a similar looking man staring back at him. He turns around quickly and is killed by a knife thrown into his chest.

While attending a party overlooking the Golden Gate Bridge, recent San Francisco divorcée and shy librarian Gloria Mundy sees a handsome young man, Tony, at the bar, who ruins the moment by stumbling and spilling all the drinks there. Gloria sits with a friend and is encouraged to open herself to new experiences. Driving home, Gloria picks up an attractive man named Bob "Scotty" Scott (Bruce Solomon) when she encounters him next to his broken down car at Powell and Market streets. She impulsively accepts Scotty's invitation to join him at the movies that evening, and before they part ways, he asks her to take his pack of cigarettes to help him curb his smoking. Unknown to her, Scotty has secreted a roll of undeveloped film in the cigarette pack. That evening, a seriously wounded Scotty meets Gloria in the movie theater and asks her about the film. He bleeds into her popcorn and warns her to "beware of the dwarf" before he dies. When his body mysteriously disappears while Gloria seeks help from the theater manager, she is unable to convince anyone of what has transpired. At home she tells her elderly neighbour/landlord Mr. Hennessey (Burgess Meredith) of the events.

At the end of the next day, Gloria is attacked in her library by albino Whitey Jackson (William Frankfather) who tries to use ether on her. She runs off and hides in a singles bar where she asks a stranger, Stanley Tibbets (Dudley Moore), to take her home, but Stanley, an aspiring British womanizer, who assumes she is picking him up to have sex, mixes a cocktail laced with Spanish Fly and puts on the Bee Gees.

Shocked by his misunderstanding, she flees and returns to her apartment, where she is attacked by a man with a scar who demands the cigarette pack Scotty had given her. When he attempts to strangle her with a scarf, Gloria stabs him in the stomach with a pair of knitting needles and calls the police for help. When the attacker tries to stop her, he is killed by a knife thrown by Whitey through the kitchen window, and Gloria faints in shock. When she awakens, all traces of what has happened have disappeared, and she is unable to convince two San Francisco police officers, Lt. Tony Carlson (Chevy Chase) and his partner Inspector "Fergie" Ferguson (Brian Dennehy), or even her landlord Mr. Hennessy that she was attacked.

Gloria is abducted by Turk Farnum (Ion Tedorescu), the chauffeur of a limousine in which she earlier had seen Whitey riding, but she manages to subdue him with mace and brass knuckles given to her by her friend and fellow library employee, Stella (Marilyn Sokol). Upon further investigation, Tony discovers that Scotty, an undercover SFPD inspector who had received a tip that a major assassination would take place in the city on a certain night, was investigating contract killer Rupert Stiltskin (alias "the Dwarf"). Now assigned to protect Gloria from her would-be killers, Tony later takes her to his houseboat, where the two fall in love.

When Tony and Fergie discover that the limousine is registered to the archdiocese of San Francisco, they visit the office of Archbishop Thorncrest (Eugene Roche), unaware that their interviewee is actually the archbishop's twin brother Charlie, who is involved in a plot to assassinate Pope Pius XIII (played by prominent San Francisco businessman Cyril Magnin) during his upcoming visit to San Francisco, and has murdered his twin in order to impersonate him. The following day, Rupert kidnaps Fergie and uses him to lure Gloria into a trap. She manages to hide in a massage parlor, where she encounters Stanley yet again, but Whitey and Stiltskin then find and abduct her.
 
At Gloria's request, Stella has researched an organization known as the Tax the Churches League, and discovered that the league is a radical fringe group founded by Delia Darrow and her husband. For the Darrows, organized religion is a corrupt, greedy sham involving powerful billion-dollar corporations. Stella gives the results of her findings to Tony, who returns to the archbishop's residence with Mr. Hennessy. Sneaking into the wine cellar, Tony discovers the imprisoned Fergie, who informs him that the Darrows hired Stiltskin to assassinate the Pope during a performance of The Mikado at the San Francisco Opera House that evening. Tony is attacked by Rupert and kills him in self-defense by toppling shelves of wine upon him, but the fake archbishop's assistant Gerda Caswell (Rachel Roberts), who is really Delia Darrow, holds him and Gloria at gunpoint.

Darrow then details her "contingency plan" to eliminate the pope: If the pope is not dead at the end of act I, Whitey Jackson will open fire from one of the auditorium's two organ bays ("He will also open fire should the pope unexpectedly leave his seat, or if the police arrive in the auditorium", Darrow explains). Mr. Hennessy knocks out Charlie and defeats Delia in a duel of martial arts, after which Tony and Gloria drive to the opera house, having some unusual problems along the way (such as crashing into an Italian restaurant and commandeering an airport limousine carrying a pair of Japanese tourists). After making it backstage, Gloria is grabbed by Jackson, who kills one of several security guards who have joined the pursuit. An enraged Gloria attempts to attack Jackson, who simply shoves her to the floor. This gives Tony the room he needs to shoot the albino, thus thwarting the plan to kill the pope. When the albino falls from the rafters, he gets tangled in ropes and activates a lever that lowers a stage-length display of the ship H.M.S. Pinafore, which is completely unrelated to the classical production. As the performance ends, Gloria and Tony are revealed onstage along with the now-dead bodies of Jackson and the guard, but the pope, who seems not to have noticed anything unusual, leads the audience in applause for the cast, the orchestra, and the conductor—Stanley Tibbets.

Cast
 Goldie Hawn as Gloria Mundy
 Chevy Chase as Lieutenant Tony Carlson
 Burgess Meredith as Mr. Hennessey
 Brian Dennehy as Inspector "Fergie" Ferguson
 Dudley Moore as Stanley Tibbets
 Rachel Roberts as Gerda Casswell/Delia Darrow
 Eugene Roche as Archbishop Thorncrest/Charlie Thorncrest
 William Frankfather as Whitey Jackson
 Marc Lawrence as Rupert Stiltskin, "The Dwarf"
 Marilyn Sokol as Stella
 Billy Barty as J.J. MacKuen
 Bruce Solomon as Bob "Scotty" Scott
 Don Calfa as Scarface
 Cyril Magnin as Pope Pius XIII
 Chuck McCann as Nuart Theatre manager
 Thomas Jamerson as Pish-Tush

Production
Foul Play is an homage to director Alfred Hitchcock, several of whose films are referenced during the film. The premise of an innocent person becoming entangled in a web of intrigue is common in Hitchcock films, such as The 39 Steps, Saboteur, North by Northwest and, most notably, The Man Who Knew Too Much, which inspired the opera house sequence in Foul Play. When Gloria is attacked in her home by a man attempting to strangle her with a scarf and she defends herself with a household object, both are references to Dial M for Murder. Other Hitchcock films which receive a nod from screenwriter/director Colin Higgins include Notorious, Vertigo, and Psycho. In addition, the plot includes a MacGuffin—an object that initially is the central focus of the film but declines in importance until it is forgotten and unexplained by the end—in the form of the roll of film concealed in the pack of cigarettes which ends up being thrown in a fire in a fireplace. Hitchcock popularized the term MacGuffin and used the technique in many of his films.

"Audiences love to be scared and at the same time they love to laugh", said Higgins. "It is tongue in cheek realism. The audience is in on the joke but the actors must carry on as if they were unaware."

The script originally was written under the name Killing Lydia with Goldie Hawn in mind for the lead. Higgins had met Hawn through their mutual friend Hal Ashby. However, the project did not take off. After Silver Streak came out, Higgins rewrote the script. He and the producers took the project to Paramount who hoped to star Farrah Fawcett. However, Fawcett was in the middle of a legal battle with the producers of Charlie's Angels so it was decided to go with Hawn.

The name Gloria Mundy is a reference to "Sic transit gloria mundi", Latin for "Thus passes the glory of the world": the phrase was part of the rite of papal coronation until 1963.

Higgins had written the role of Stanley Tibbets for Tim Conway, but when the actor turned it down he offered it to Dudley Moore instead. It was Moore's American film debut and led to his being cast in 10 by Blake Edwards the following year.

Higgins says when he sold the script he wanted to direct it so badly he did not care who was going to play the lead roles. He met with Fawcett to play the female lead before going with Goldie Hawn. His first choice for the male lead was Harrison Ford (who had been Higgins' carpenter) who turned it down. Steve Martin was offered the role but did not end up playing it. Higgins says he offered the part to another actor who wanted to play the cop and Stanley Tibbets. Eventually Chevy Chase was cast.

The film was shot in and around San Francisco, in locations including Noe Valley, the Mission District, Hallidie Plaza, Telegraph Hill, Hayes Valley, Nob Hill, Pacific Heights, Fort Mason, the Marina District, the Presidio, Potrero Hill, Japantown, and the War Memorial Opera House. The lobby scenes of the opera house were filmed in the rotunda of San Francisco City Hall across the street. The Nuart Theatre, in which Bob Scott dies early in the film, is an art house located on Santa Monica Boulevard in West Los Angeles. The houseboat "Galatea" was located at 15 Yellow Ferry Harbor in Sausalito.

"Ready to Take a Chance Again", the film's theme song, was composed by Charles Fox, with lyrics by Fox's writing partner Norman Gimbel and performed by Barry Manilow, who conceived and supervised the song's recording in partnership with Ron Dante. The soundtrack also includes "Copacabana" written by Manilow, Bruce Sussman and Jack Feldman, and performed by Manilow; "I Feel the Earth Move" by Carole King, and "Stayin' Alive", written and performed by the Bee Gees. Excerpts from Act I of Gilbert & Sullivan's The Mikado, conducted by Julius Rudel, are performed by members of the New York City Opera. Arista Records issued the album on LP and cassette, with Intrada Records reissuing it on compact disc in 2009. Varèse Sarabande released it in 2016, with Charles Fox's theme for the television series as a bonus track.

A novelization, by James Cass Rogers, based upon the screenplay by Colin Higgins, was published by Jove Books in conjunction with the release of the film in 1978.

Critical reception
Janet Maslin of The New York Times called the film "a slick, attractive, enjoyable movie with all the earmarks of a hit. But as House Calls did a few months ago, it starts out promising genuine wit and originality only to fall back on more familiar tactics after a half-hour or so. If either film had a less winning opening, perhaps it wouldn't leave a vague aftertaste of disappointment. Colin Higgins...has aimed for the same kind of thriller-comedy-romance hybrid he attempted in writing Silver Streak, and this time he's much more successful ...Still, Mr. Higgins isn't a facile enough juggler to keep the film's diverse elements from colliding at times."

Arthur D. Murphy of Variety called it "an excellent film", adding "Writer Colin Higgins makes a good directorial bow. Goldie Hawn is superb in a strong return to pictures, and Chevy Chase, also above title, works well as a screen partner."

Gene Siskel of the Chicago Tribune gave the film 3 stars out of 4 and called it "an attractive minor comedy, the kind of film best described as 'cute.'" On a 1986 Tonight Show appearance, Roger Ebert called the film "a very good picture."

Charles Champlin of the Los Angeles Times remarked that "Foul Play does offer a kind of duplex pleasure—as a celebration of the movies the way they used to make them, sleek, funny, exciting but unworrying, and in its own terms as a vividly adventurous romantic comedy."

Gary Arnold of The Washington Post wrote "Foul Play never begins to make sense as a mystery story, and it's not incidentally amusing or stylish. At best, the film can be accepted as a harmless assortment of fake-outs and distractions, alternating in tone from innocuous to vicious, from disarming to offensive."

Time Out London stated "Unsatisfactory as a whole, the film is hilarious and tense in bits" and noted "while writer/director Higgins uses almost every stock thriller device...he approaches this semi-parody with more zest and originality than is common."

Channel 4 called the film "a finely tuned and fast-paced offering which is chock-full of black comic twists and perfect casting."

On review aggregator Rotten Tomatoes, the film holds a 74% approval rating based on 27 reviews, with an average rating of 6.4/10. Metacritic, which uses a weighted average, assigned the film a score of 45 out of 100, based on seven critics, indicating "mixed or average reviews".

Awards and nominations

References

External links
 
 
 
 

1978 films
1970s comedy thriller films
Albinism in popular culture
American comedy thriller films
American comedy mystery films
1970s comedy mystery films
1978 directorial debut films
1970s English-language films
Fratricide in fiction
Films about assassinations
Films adapted into television shows
Films directed by Colin Higgins
Films scored by Charles Fox
Films set in San Francisco
Films set in the San Francisco Bay Area
Films set in libraries
Films shot in San Francisco
Films with screenplays by Colin Higgins
Paramount Pictures films
Films about people with dwarfism
Films about librarians
1978 comedy films
Films set in a movie theatre
1970s American films